Laurens Bogtman (8 February 1900 in Oudkarspel – 1969 in Hilversum, the Netherlands) was a Dutch baritone.

Unlike many contemporary singers his career began late, at the age of 30, and he studied singing in Berlin, with Otto Iro in Vienna and with Aaltje Noordewier-Reddingius in Hilversum.

Bogtmam debuted in 1932 in a concert with the Kölner Bachverein (Cologne Bach Society). He then had a successful career as an oratorio singer in Germany, Austria and England and travelled further afield.

Following World War II, Bogtman sang in France and Belgium. In a 1957 recording of Bach's St Matthew Passion with De Nederlandse Bachvereniging, conducted by Anthon van der Horst, he was the Vox Christi.

References

1900 births
1969 deaths
People from Langedijk
Dutch operatic baritones
20th-century Dutch male singers